St Oliver's Community College is a secondary school on Rathmullan Road, in Drogheda, Republic of Ireland. It was built in 1980 and has 1,280 students.

References

Schools in the Republic of Ireland